The men's foil was one of eight fencing events on the fencing at the 1964 Summer Olympics programme. It was the fourteenth appearance of the event. The competition was held from October 13 to October 14, 1964. 55 fencers from 21 nations competed. Nations had been limited to three fencers each since 1928. The event was won by Egon Franke of Poland, the nation's first victory in the men's foil. France returned to the podium after a one-Games absence, with Jean-Claude Magnan taking silver and Daniel Revenu the bronze.

Background

This was the 14th appearance of the event, which has been held at every Summer Olympics except 1908 (when there was a foil display only rather than a medal event). Five of the eight finalists from 1960 returned: gold medalist Viktor Zhdanovich of the Soviet Union, bronze medalist Albie Axelrod of the United States, fourth-place finisher Witold Woyda of Poland, fifth-place finisher Mark Midler of the Soviet Union, and seventh-place finisher Bill Hoskyns of Great Britain. Jean-Claude Magnan of France was the reigning world champion. The previous two world champions, Ryszard Parulski of Poland and German Sveshnikov, were also competing in Tokyo.

Iran, Malaysia, and South Korea each made their debut in the men's foil. The United States made its 13th appearance, most of any nation, having missed only the inaugural 1896 competition.

Competition format

The 1964 tournament introduced a hybrid pool-play and knockout format. The competition began with two rounds of pool play. In each round, the fencers were divided into pools to play a round-robin within the pool. Bouts were to five touches. Barrages were used to break ties necessary for advancement. The competition then shifted to knockout rounds. These rounds used a single-elimination tournament format to reduce the remaining field from 24 to 16, then from 16 to 8, then from 8 to 4. There were also classification semifinals and a fifth-place match for the quarterfinal losers. Bouts in these knockout rounds were to 10 touches. The four quarterfinal winners then resumed pool play once again for the final.

Standard foil rules were used, including that touches had to be made with the tip of the foil, the target area was limited to the torso, and priority determined the winner of double touches.

 Round 1: There were 9 pools of 6 or 7 fencers each. The top 4 fencers in each pool advanced to round 2.
 Round 2: There were 6 pools of 6 fencers each. The top 4 fencers in each pool advanced to the knockout rounds.
 Knockout rounds: The 24 fencers were seeded into a truncated single-elimination tournament. Eight received byes into the round of 16. Three knockout rounds were held, finishing with the quarterfinals.
 Classification: There were knockout-style classification matches for 5th place (two 5th–8th semifinals and a 5th/6th match).
 Final: The final pool had 4 fencers.

Schedule

All times are Japan Standard Time (UTC+9)

Results

Round 1

Pool A

The three-way tie for third-place resulted in a barrage in the first pool. After each fencer went 1-1 in the barrage, touches received was used to break the tie. Cohen's 6 gave him the win over McKenzie's 7 and Elkalyoubi's 8; Cohen received third place. The tie-breaker then went back to head-to-head results between the two remaining fencers in the barrage to assign fourth place; Elkalyoubi had defeated McKenzie in their bout (and, incidentally, had defeated him in the main pool as well), so he placed fourth and advanced while McKenzie was eliminated.

 Barrage A

Pool B

The second pool required no barrage; ties within the top four were nominally broken by touches against (15-18 in favor of Sehem in the top two places) and then touches scored (21-18 for Okawa after he and Curletto tied at 18-18 in touches against).

Pool C

Pool D

Pool E

Touches against were 12-16-19 to break the three-way tie for second place.

Pool F

Pool G

Pool H

Pool I

Touches against were 14-18-20 to break the three-way tie for second and 22-24 to break the two-way tie for fifth.

Round 2

Pool A

Touches against were 16-16-19 to break the three-way tie for second into second/third and fourth places, with touches scored 23-22 to separate second and third.

Pool B

Touches against broke the tie for second and third, with 14-16. Since the tie for fourth and fifth determined advancement, another bout was fenced. Tabuchi, who had won the main-pool bout, defeated Sehem again in the barrage to win a qualification spot.

 Barrage B

Pool C

The three-way tie for first was broken by touches against (16-18-20), but the three-way tie for fourth required a barrage. Elkalyoubi, fencing in the first two bouts of the barrage, won both to clinch advancement and make a bout between Granieri and Haukler unnecessary. Their main-pool touches against (17-19) decided the fifth and sixth places.

 Barrage C

Pool D

A three-way tie for third place required a barrage, with two fencers advancing and the third eliminated. Cohen, who had beaten Muresan but lost to Mano in the main pool, won both of his barrage bouts to take third place. Mano defeated Muresan in the other barrage bout to revenge his loss in the main pool and take fourth, qualifying for the third round.

 Barrage D

Pool E

The fifth pool resulted in a four-way tie for third place, out of which two fencers would advance and two would be eliminated. The barrage resulted in two fencers going 2-1 to advance (with Jay's 20-21 edge in main-pool touches against giving him third place) and two going 1-2 (Parulski took fifth with 19 touches against in the main pool to Courtillat's 21) to be knocked out.

 Barrage E

Pool F

Since the three-way tie for second didn't matter for qualification, it was broken by touches against. Magnan's 13 gave him second place, while Brecht and Kamuti were still tied at 17. They maintained their tie even through touches scored at 20, so both received third place in the pool.

Knockout rounds

The winner of each group advanced to the final pool, while the runner-up moved into a 5th-place semifinal.

Group 1

Group 2

Group 3

Group 4

Fifth place classification

Final

References

Sources
 

Fencing at the 1964 Summer Olympics
Men's events at the 1964 Summer Olympics